Haren (Ems) is a railway station located in Emmeln, near Haren, Lower Saxony, Germany. It lies on the Emsland Railway (Rheine - Norddeich) and is operated by WestfalenBahn.

Regional service
 Emden - Leer - Lingen - Rheine - Münster

References

Railway stations in Lower Saxony